The spouses of the heads of state carried no official duties and received no salary. Nonetheless, they attended many official ceremonies and functions of state either along with or in place of the head of state.

List of spouses

Soviet Union-related lists
Lists of spouses of national leaders